The First Presbyterian Church is a historic Presbyterian church at 2nd and Hempstead Streets in Nashville, Arkansas. The building is now home to the E. A. Williams Chapel and Museum, and is owned and operated by the Howard County Historical Society. The building is a single-story wood-frame structure, constructed in 1912 by builder Elijah Alexander Williams. It is roughly L-shaped, and exhibits a combination of Queen Anne and Stick styling that is rare in southwestern Arkansas.

The building was listed on the National Register of Historic Places in 1976.

See also
National Register of Historic Places listings in Howard County, Arkansas

References

External links
Museum web site

Presbyterian churches in Arkansas
Churches on the National Register of Historic Places in Arkansas
Queen Anne architecture in Arkansas
Churches completed in 1912
Churches in Howard County, Arkansas
Museums in Howard County, Arkansas
1912 establishments in Arkansas
National Register of Historic Places in Howard County, Arkansas
Stick-Eastlake architecture in the United States
Nashville, Arkansas